Dewey is an unincorporated community and census-designated place (CDP) in Beaverhead County, Montana, United States. It is in the northeast part of the county, on the south side of the Big Hole River, and bordered to the north, across the river, by Silver Bow County.

Dewey was first listed as a CDP prior to the 2020 census.

Demographics

References 

Census-designated places in Beaverhead County, Montana
Census-designated places in Montana